Claravalls is a locality located in the municipality of Tàrrega, in Province of Lleida province, Catalonia, Spain. As of 2020, it has a population of 120.

Geography 
Claravalls is located 60km east of Lleida.

References

Populated places in the Province of Lleida